Mohd Fadzrul Danel bin Mohd Nizam (born 14 January 1998) is a Malaysian professional footballer who plays as a central midfielder for Malaysia Super League side Kedah Darul Aman. Danel entered SM Swasta Saleha, Genting Highlands at his youth and represented Pahang in MSSM Football Tournament.

Club career

Kedah Darul Aman
He was part of the Kedah Darul Aman's 2018 Sukma Games team which won the silver medalist. He became the regular during the tournament. His performances during Sukma Games have attracted the interest of Kedah Football Association management. He scores Malaysia FA Cup final and won the cup.

Career statistics

Club

Honours

Kedah Darul Aman
 Malaysia FA Cup: 2019
 Malaysia Cup: 2019
 Malaysia Super League runner-up: 2021, 2020

References

External links
 

1998 births
Living people
People from Kedah
Malaysian people of Malay descent
Malaysian footballers
Kedah Darul Aman F.C. players
Malaysia Super League players
Association football midfielders